CAFL may refer to:

 Central Australian Football League, Australian rules football competition
 China Arena Football League, arena football league